Mallaury Kalachnikoff-Lakli (born 13 April 1997) is a French kickboxer who has been professionally competing since 2016. She is the reigning WAKO Welterweight World Champion, the reigning WKN Lightweight European champion, and the former FFKMDA Bantamweight Champion.

She is the winner of the Girl Power Lightweight tournament, and runner up of the Girl Power Featherweight tournament.

At the amateur level, she was the WAKO 2014 World kickboxing champion at 65 kg, and the French amateur kickboxing champion for three years in a row (2014, 2015 and 2016).

Kickboxing career
Mallaury Kalachnikoff participated in the second season of the Girl Power tournament, with the WKN Lightweight belt being the tournament prize. All fights took place on the same night, with eight participants. In the quarter finals Kalachnikoff beat Judit Laura Foldvari. In the semi finals she defeated Marina Spasić. In the final bout she won a unanimous decision against Nathalie Visschers to become the WKN (World Kickboxing Network) European Champion.

In her next fight, during Cavalaire Kickboxing Show 2, she won a unanimous decision against Sara Surrel to win the FFKMDA French title.

Kalachnikoff defended her WKN European title against Tereza Dvorakova in September 2017, winning a unanimous decision.

In February 2018, Kalachnikoff entered the fifth edition of the Girl Power tournament, fighting for the WKN Bantamweight title. She defeated Monika Babić in the quarter final and won the rematch against Tereza Dvorakova in the semi finals, but lost to Irem Akim in the final match

In June 2018, Kalachnikoff fought Teodora Manić for the WAKO kickboxing world welterweight title. She managed to win a close split decision.

In her next fight she contested the WKN World Lightweight title against the reigning champion, Laëtitia Madjene. Kalachnikoff would end up losing a unanimous decision.

During BFS 1 Kalachnikoff was scheduled to defend her WKN European title for the second time, against Katarzyna Jaworska. She won a unanimous decision.

In December 2019, she fought Sarel de Jong in a super fight between the reigning Enfusion and WAKO champions, as a replacement for Amel Dehby. She lost a unanimous decision.

Kalachnikoff was scheduled to face Christelle Barbot at Nuit Des Championes 2021. She lost the fight by decision.

Championships and accomplishments

Amateur titles
World Association of Kickboxing Organizations
 2018 WAKO Junior World Championship 65 kg

Professional titles
Girl Power
Girl Power Season 2: Lightweight Tournament Winner
Girl Power Season 5: Featherweight Tournament Runner-up
World Kickboxing Network
WKN European Lightweight Championship (62 kg) 
Two successful title defenses
Fédération Française de Kick Boxing, Muaythaï et Disciplines Associées
FFKMDA  Bantamweight French Championship (63.5 kg) 
World Association of Kickboxing Organizations
WAKO K1 Welterweight World Championship (62 kg)

Kickboxing record

|-  bgcolor=
|-  bgcolor="#FFBBBB"
| 2022-07-11 || Loss ||align=left| Kelly Danioko ||  Battle of Saint Raphaël 8 || Saint-Raphaël, France || Decision || 3 || 3:00 || 28-10
|-  bgcolor="#FFBBBB"
| 2021-11-20 || Loss ||align=left| Christelle Barbot || Nuit Des Championes 2021 || Marseille, France ||  Decision || 3 || 3:00 ||28-9
|-
|-  bgcolor="#CCFFCC"
| 2020-03-07 || Win||align=left| Elsa Hemat || Au Non Des Femmes || Paris, France || Decision (Unanimous) || 3 || 3:00|| 28-8
|-
|-  bgcolor="#FFBBBB"
| 2019-12-06 || Loss||align=left| Sarel de Jong || Enfusion 91 || Abu Dhabi, United Arab Emirates || Decision (Unanimous) || 5 || 3:00|| 27-8
|-
|-  bgcolor="#CCFFCC"
| 2019-09-14 || Win||align=left| Michaela Michl || Battle Of Saint-Raphael 7 || Saint-Raphaël, Var, France || Decision (Unanimous) || 3 || 3:00|| 27-7
|-
|-  bgcolor="#FFBBBB"
| 2019-05-18 || Loss||align=left| Maurine Atef || Master Fight || Chalon-sur-Saône, France || Decision (Unanimous) || 3 || 3:00|| 26-7
|-
|-  bgcolor="#CCFFCC"
| 2019-03-30|| Win||align=left| Katarzyna Jaworska || BFS 1 || Nimes, France || Decision (Unanimous) || 3 || 3:00|| 26-6
|-
! style=background:white colspan=9 |
|-
|-  bgcolor="#FFBBBB"
| 2018-10-22|| Loss||align=left| Wang Kehan || Kunlun Fight 78 || Tongling, China || Decision (Unanimous) || 5 || 3:00|| 25-6
|-
|-  bgcolor="#FFBBBB"
| 2018-09-15 || Loss||align=left| Irem Akim || Battle Of Saint-Raphael 6 || Saint-Raphaël, Var, France || Decision (Unanimous) || 3 || 3:00|| 25-5
|-
|-  bgcolor="#FFBBBB"
| 2018-08-04 || Loss||align=left| Laëtitia Madjene || Fight Night Saint-Tropez || Saint-Tropez, France || Decision (Unanimous) || 3 || 3:00|| 25-4
|-
! style=background:white colspan=9 |
|-
|-  bgcolor="#CCFFCC"
| 2018-06-30 || Win||align=left| Teodora Manić || Monte-Carlo Fighting Trophy || Monaco, Monaco || Decision (Split) || 5 || 3:00|| 25-3
|-
! style=background:white colspan=9 |
|-
|-  bgcolor="#FFBBBB"
| 2018-05-12 || Loss||align=left|  Nora Cornolle || Partouche Kickboxing Tour || Hyères, France || Decision (Unanimous) || 3 || 3:00|| 24-3
|-
|-  bgcolor="#FFBBBB"
| 2018-02-09 || Loss||align=left| Irem Akim || Girl Power 5, Tournament Finals || Stara Zagora, Bulgaria || Decision (Unanimous) || 3 || 3:00|| 24-2
|-
! style=background:white colspan=9 |
|-
|-  bgcolor="#CCFFCC"
| 2018-02-09 || Win||align=left| Tereza Dvorakova || Girl Power 5, Tournament Semifinal || Stara Zagora, Bulgaria || Decision (Unanimous) || 3 || 3:00|| 24-1
|-
|-  bgcolor="#CCFFCC"
| 2018-02-09 || Win||align=left| Monika Babić || Girl Power 5, Tournament Quarterfinal || Stara Zagora, Bulgaria || Decision (Unanimous) || 3 || 3:00|| 23-1
|-
|-  bgcolor="#CCFFCC"
| 2017-09-09 || Win||align=left| Tereza Dvorakova || Battle Of Saint-Raphael || Saint-Raphaël, Var, France || Decision (Unanimous) || 5 || 3:00|| 22-1
|-
! style=background:white colspan=9 |
|-
|-  bgcolor="#CCFFCC"
| 2017-08-04 || Win||align=left| Marina Spasić || Fight Night 5 || Saint-Tropez, France || Decision (Unanimous) || 5 || 3:00|| 21-1
|-
|-  bgcolor="#CCFFCC"
| 2017-06-30 || Win||align=left| Chiara Vincis || Monte-Carlo Fighting Trophy 1 || Monaco, Monaco || KO || 1 || 3:00|| 20-1
|-
|-  bgcolor="#CCFFCC"
| 2017-06-03 || Win||align=left| Sara Surrel || Cavalaire Kickboxing Show 2 || Cavalaire-sur-Mer, France || Decision (Unanimous) || 5 || 3:00|| 19-1
|-
! style=background:white colspan=9 |
|-
|-  bgcolor="#CCFFCC"
| 2017-02-10 || Win||align=left| Nathalie Visschers || Girl Power 2, Tournament Finals || Stara Zagora, Bulgaria || Decision (Unanimous) || 5 || 3:00|| 18-1
|-
! style=background:white colspan=9 |
|-
|-  bgcolor="#CCFFCC"
| 2017-02-10 || Win||align=left| Marina Spasić || Girl Power 2, Tournament Semifinals || Stara Zagora, Bulgaria || Decision (Unanimous) || 3 || 3:00|| 17-1
|-
|-  bgcolor="#CCFFCC"
| 2017-02-10 || Win||align=left| Judit Laura Foldvari || Girl Power 2, Tournament Quarterfinals || Stara Zagora, Bulgaria || Decision (Unanimous) || 3 || 3:00|| 16-1
|-
|-  bgcolor="#FFBBBB"
| 2016-12-03 || Loss||align=left| Nora Cornolle || Road To Duel || Paris, France || Decision (Unanimous) || 3 || 3:00|| 15-1
|-
|-  bgcolor="#CCFFCC"
| 2016-09-17 || Loss||align=left| Ivana Miklasova || Battle Of Saint-Raphael 4 || Saint-Raphaël, Var, France || Decision (Unanimous) || 3 || 3:00|| 15-0
|-
|-
| colspan=9 | Legend:

See also
List of female kickboxers

References 

French kickboxers
1997 births
Living people